Reale is a surname. Notable people with the surname include:

Damien Reale (born 1981), Irish hurler
David Reale (born 1984), Canadian actor
Enzo Reale (born 1991), French footballer
Federigo Reale, 19th-century Italian painter
Giovanni Reale (1931–2014), Italian historian of philosophy
Liam Reale (born 1983), Irish middle-distance runner
Mark Reale (1955–2012), American guitarist
Michele Reale (born 1971), Italian golfer
Michelle Reale, American poet, academic and ethnographer
Miguel Reale (1910–2006), Brazilian jurist, philosopher, academic, politician and poet
Oronzo Reale (1902–1988), Italian politician
Robert Reale (born 1956), American composer
Willie Reale, American writer

See also
Real (disambiguation)